Ella Ratilainen (born 17 May 1997) is a Finnish aesthetic group gymnast. She is a five-time (2015 - 2019) Finnish National champion in Aesthetic group gymnastics competing with Team Minetit. She is a two-time (2015, 2017) AGG World champion and the 2016 AGG European champion.

References

External links 
 

1997 births
Living people
Finnish gymnasts
Sportspeople from Helsinki